RCW 103 is a supernova remnant with right ascension 16h17m30s and declination −51° 02′. It is approximately 2000 years old and contains x-ray source 1E 161348-5055 at its heart. It is 10,000 light years away in the constellation Norma (constellation).

References

External links
 Supernova Leaves Behind Mysterious Object (SpaceDaily) 
 The Nature of the Radio-quiet Compact X-Ray Source in Supernova Remnant RCW 103 (The Astrophysical Journal)

Supernova remnants
Norma (constellation)
?